The City of Atlanta Historic Preservation and Urban Design Commission, which is part of the City of Atlanta government, nominates and designates five types of historic properties: Landmark Building or Site, Historic Building or Site, Landmark District, Historic District, and Conservation District. The Atlanta Urban Design Commission was established by city ordinance in 1975. In 1989, the city enacted its current historic preservation ordinance. Since that time, the city has designated more than seventy individual properties and eighteen districts. There are specific criteria for each type of designation.

These designations are city-level designations, separate from the federally designated properties on the National Register of Historic Places (see National Register of Historic Places listings in Fulton County, Georgia).

List of individual designated sites
The following places are designated as either as a "Landmark Building or Site" or "Historic Building or Site."

The Georgia State Capitol is designated an "Honorary Landmark," the only site to be so designated by the City of Atlanta.

List of designated districts
The following are designated as a "Landmark District," "Historic District," or "Conservation District."

References

City of Atlanta-designated historic sites
Buildings and structures in Atlanta
History of Atlanta
Atlanta